Cody Rogers is an American politician and businessman serving as a member of the Oklahoma Senate from the 37th district. Elected in November 2020, he assumed office on January 11, 2021.

Background 
Rogers graduated from Catoosa High School. Rogers has owned a paving construction company since 2015. He was elected to the Oklahoma Senate in November 2020 after defeating Democratic incumbent Allison Ikley-Freeman. He assumed office on January 11, 2021.

References 

Living people
Republican Party Oklahoma state senators
Year of birth missing (living people)